Kabolabad (also Romanized as Kābolābād and Kāblābād; also known as Kābol) is a village in Keyvan Rural District, in the Central District of Khoda Afarin County, East Azerbaijan Province, Iran. At the 2006 census, its population was 73, in 21 families.

References 

Populated places in Khoda Afarin County